Penthesilea (minor planet designation: 271 Penthesilea) is a mid-sized main belt asteroid that was discovered by Viktor Knorre on 13 October 1887 in Berlin. It was his last asteroid discovery. The asteroid was named after Penthesilea, the mythical Greek queen of the Amazons.

Photometric observations of this asteroid were made in early 2009 at the Organ Mesa Observatory in Las Cruces, New Mexico. The resulting light curve shows a synodic rotation period of 18.787 ± 0.001 hours with a brightness variation of 0.32 ± 0.04 in magnitude.

References

External links
 
 

Background asteroids
Penthesilea
Penthesilea
PC-type asteroids (Tholen)
18871013